Rodolfo Zapata (10 May 1932 – 1 August 2019) was an Argentine singer, songwriter, musician, and actor. He had an extensive career, and was popular throughout Latin America.

References

1932 births
2019 deaths
Folklorists
Argentine folk singers
20th-century Argentine male singers
Argentine male singer-songwriters
Argentine male actors
Singers from Buenos Aires
Male actors from Buenos Aires